Ocean Grove is a seaside town in Victoria, Australia, located on the Bellarine Peninsula. At the 2016 census, Ocean Grove had a population of 14,165.

History
In 1869, American Methodists established a permanent religious camp community on the coast at Ocean Grove, New Jersey, in the United States of America.  It was so successful that they decided to spread their camps overseas, including to Australia.  Following a collaboration with the Victorian Methodists, an initial camp was set up near Point Lonsdale.  By 1882 they needed to acquire a larger area, so they could establish their Australian Ocean Grove community.

The site chosen was on the eastern side of the mouth of the Barwon River, overlooking Bass Strait.

In 1887, Charles James and James Grigg purchased, surveyed and subdivided land into 2,500 blocks bearing the covenant "no part of the above Land shall be used for the Manufacture or Sale of Malted Spirituous, or Vinous Liquors". Due to this covenant, no bars or public houses could sell liquor within the town limits. The Ocean Grove Coffee Palace was built for the Methodist and Temperance Society, the first church service was held on 1 January 1888, and the population was such that a post office opened on 14 September 1888.

In 1927, the town was linked by the Barwon Heads Bridge to Barwon Heads on the other side of the river, previous access being by rowboat.

Many streets were named after important people in the Methodist community, while the local youth camp was run by the Methodist (later Uniting) Church from the 1920s until 1996.

In 2014, the Victorian Civil and Administrative Tribunal (VCAT) ruled that the liquor ban was no longer enforceable. The township now has a number of bars that can legally serve alcohol.

Collendina
Collendina is a small section of Ocean Grove. When the town of Ocean Grove was established it was a Methodist town, and it was the ruling of the Methodists that it would remain a dry town.  Because Ocean Grove was free of alcohol outlets, the town of Collendina grew up around the Collendina pub and caravan park just outside the Ocean Grove boundary. Eventually the two towns merged to form one urban area. The prohibition was officially lifted in Ocean Grove in 2006, although many cafes and restaurants were already beginning to serve alcoholic drinks.

Today
Now the largest town on the Bellarine Peninsula, Ocean Grove has the largest shopping centre on the peninsula.  Only a few blocks from the beach, it is popular with tourists and locals alike.  In 2005 a new shopping centre was built in the Collendina area, allowing the locals to shop at both Coles and Woolworths supermarkets.

Ocean Grove has a resident population of about 12,000 which, during the school summer holidays, swells to four times this number as tourists from Melbourne, Geelong, interstate, and overseas flock in.  The area offers surf beaches, fishing, kayaking, canoeing, bushwalking and other outdoor activities.  The Ocean Grove Nature Reserve preserves some remnant native woodland and contains walking tracks.

Significant infrastructure development in Ocean Grove during 2008-2009 has resulted in two soccer pitches, indoor swimming complex complete with a 25m pool and a four-star Skate Park with Bowl suitable for boards, blades and bikes.

While tourism makes the largest contribution to the local economy, during the slower months a larger proportion of local income is derived from orchards, fruit and vegetable growers, and the local wineries.

One of the local newspapers is the Ocean Grove Voice.

In December 2019 the Kingston Village shopping complex located on Grubb Road opened to the public. It is the biggest shopping complex on the peninsula, housing a McDonald's, Woolworths, Dan Murphy's, Aldi, Caltex petrol station, Zack's dog bath and a Bakers Delight alongside numerous eateries and specialty stores.

Sport
The town has an Australian Rules football team competing in the Bellarine Football League.

The Surfside Waves Soccer Club competes in the Geelong Regional Football Association.

Golfers play at the course of the Ocean Grove Golf Club on Guthridge Street.

The town hosts a Bi-annual Geelong gaming competition with teams from around the greater Geelong region competing for a minor cash prize and qualification for the state competition held in Broadmeadows.

Other Sports:
Shell Road Complex & Surrounds
 Indoor Volleyball
 Indoor Basketball
 Indoor Soccer (during summer)
 Indoor Basketball
 Indoor Netball
 Indoor equestrian
 Outdoor Paintball
 Ping Pong League 
 Competitive E-Sports

There are also two tennis clubs with modern facilities - Ocean Grove Tennis Club - Madeley St and Surfside Tennis Club - Shell Road (next to the new aquatic and sports centre).

Popular culture
Ocean Grove was featured in the 2006 film Kenny, while the bridge between Ocean Grove and Barwon Heads featured in the popular ABC television show SeaChange. The town is also the home town of fishing personality Ross Gould.

The rock band The Murlocs formed in Ocean Grove.

The metal band Ocean Grove is named after the town.

References

External links
 Bellarine Historical Society: History of Ocean Grove
 Great Ocean Rd info
 Ocean Grove Voice newspaper
 Ocean Grove Business Association

Towns in Victoria (Australia)
Coastal towns in Victoria (Australia)
Bellarine Peninsula
Suburbs of Geelong